Alexander Morgan may refer to:

Alexander Morgan (cricketer) (born 1959), Jamaican
Alexander Morgan (cyclist) (born 1994), Australian
Alexander Morgan (mathematician) (1860–1946), Scottish

See also
Alex Morgan (disambiguation)
Morgan Alexander (disambiguation)